Jones Ridge is an unincorporated community in Degognia Township, Jackson County, Illinois, United States.

References

Unincorporated communities in Jackson County, Illinois
Unincorporated communities in Illinois